Alphons Augustinus Barb (born: Alfons Ascher Barb; 15 April 1901 – 13 November 1979) was an Austrian academic, archaeologist, numismatist, museum director and author who received recognition both from his native Austria and in Britain for his contribution to the Arts and Sciences. He was the founding director of the Burgenland Landesmuseum in Eisenstadt, Austria and throughout his life remained a committed advocate for this region and its people. Being Jewish, he was removed from his job as a public servant immediately following the Anschluss and fled to Britain with his young family. In 1949 Barb joined the Warburg Institute, ultimately becoming Librarian and publishing extensively in both English and German.

Family and education
The son of Moriz Barb, an engineer in the Austro-Hungarian army, and Henrietta Schrenzel, Barb was born in Vienna, the second of four children. His grandfathers were Isaac Barb and D. H. Schrenzel from Galicia (now Ukraine), both notable for their roles in the revival of the Hebrew language during the mid 19th century. A student at the University of Vienna, he was obliged to put his studies on hold to support his family by working as a goldsmith. Under the tutelage of Wilhelm Kubitschek, he finally received his doctorate at the age of 25 for his thesis on the coinage of Cilicia. During his time at the university, Barb was selected to work on archaeological digs by Adolf Mahr  in support of whom he gave testimony after the war during the latter's denazification process. In 1975 Barb was awarded the title of professor and a golden doctor's diploma by the university.

Austria and the Anschluss
Shortly after receiving his doctorate, Barb was chosen by Sándor Wolf, the philanthropist, art collector and wine merchant, to create and manage the Landesmuseum for the Burgenland. In his role as director of the museum he was a tireless advocate for the region's culture, history and environment. However, as was the case for all Jews operating as public servants at the time of the Anschluss, he was dismissed from his post and then required to leave Eisenstadt. With the support of ESG Robinson, then Deputy Keeper of the Coin and Medal Department, British Museum he was given entry to the United Kingdom but following the outbreak of war was interned on the Isle of Man as an enemy alien. He was subsequently released to work as a factory tool-fitter in Leeds, where he remained for a number of years.

Warburg Institute
In 1949 Barb took up the role of assistant librarian at the Warburg Institute, becoming librarian in 1956. He worked under a number of directors, including E.H. Gombrich, and, in addition to his special interest in the Burgenland, continued to publish extensively on the fields of folklore and magic in the ancient world. Following his retirement, he was made an Honorary Fellow of the institute.

Honours and awards
Among others:

Austrian Cross of Honour for Science and Art First Class

Grand Decoration of the Burgenland

Fellow of the Society of Antiquaries of London

Honorary Fellow of the Royal Numismatic Society

References

 Österreichisches Biographisches Lexicon. 
 "Obituary" The Times 17 November 1979
 "Amtliche Personalnachrichten" Wiener Zeitung 26 February 1969
 "Dr.Barb erhielt Ehrenkreuz" Burgenlandisches Volksblatt 25 January 1969
 Mullins, Gerry (2007). Dublin Nazi No. 1 : the life of Adolf Mahr. Dublin, Ireland: Liberties Press. 

1901 births
1979 deaths
Archaeologists from Vienna
Jewish emigrants from Austria to the United Kingdom after the Anschluss
People associated with the Warburg Institute
Recipients of the Austrian Cross of Honour for Science and Art, 1st class
Fellows of the Society of Antiquaries of London